Antigonea or Antigoneia may refer to :
 Antigoneia Troas, city in the ancient Troad
 Antigonia (Chaonia), city in ancient Epirus
 Mantinea, city in ancient Greece
 Nicaea, ancient city in modern-day Turkey (now İznik)